The Front Line (also known as Battle of Highlands) is a 2011 South Korean war film directed by Jang Hoon, set during the 1953 ceasefire of the Korean War. This is the third film by director Jang Hoon, after completing Secret Reunion and Rough Cut. It won four Grand Bell Awards, including Best Film. It was selected as South Korea's submission to the 84th Academy Awards for Best Foreign Language Film, but did not make the final shortlist.

Plot 
Early in the Korean War in 1950, as the North is rolling through South Korea, South Korean army privates Kang Eun-pyo (Shin Ha-kyun) and Kim Soo-hyeok (Go Soo) are captured in a battle and brought to Korean People's Army captain Jung-yoon. Jung-yoon declares to the prisoners that the war will be over in a week and that he knows exactly why they are fighting the war, before releasing the prisoners, so that they can help reconstruct the nation after the war.

Three years later, in 1953, the war has not ended. Despite ceasefire negotiations, the fighting continues around the hills on the 38th Parallel, as each side fights to determine the future dividing line between North and South. The hills, used as bargaining chips in the negotiations, change hands constantly and so quickly that the ceasefire negotiators don't always know who controls them, yet they are coveted by both sides.

Amidst the fighting, a South Korean officer commanding 'Alligator' Company, fighting at the Aerok Hills, is found dead, killed by a Southern bullet. The now-First Lieutenant Eun-Pyo of the South Korean Army's Counterintelligence Corps (the precursor to South Korea's current Defense Security Command) is sent to investigate the murder and find an apparent mole there who had been mailing letters from Northern troops to into the South.

Eun-pyo arrives at the front lines accompanied by Captain Jae-oh, the replacement commanding officer, and new soldier Pvt. Nam Seong-shik. Eun-Pyo's perceptions change quickly upon arriving at the front. The acting commander, Captain Young-Il, though a skilled soldier, is addicted to morphine, the men actively wear captured enemy uniforms and use Communist vocabulary while talking. War orphans live among the soldiers, the discipline is lax, and the mental health of some men is questionable. Eun-Pyo's old friend Kim Soo-Hyeok reappears, now also a First Lieutenant. A far cry from the cowering incompetent Eun-pyo once knew, he has become a ruthless killer and expert platoon leader. The entire unit also seems burdened about something that happened in Pohang earlier in the war.

Their former captor, Jung-Yoon, is revealed to be commanding the North Korean forces against them; he too is severely strained by the war and is struggling to keep his similarly battered veteran unit together. Captain Jae-oh makes a bad impression by ignoring the veteran officers' experience and makes serious tactical errors. Eun-pyo is stunned after witnessing Soo-hyeok murdering surrendered North Koreans as they do not have time to properly take them prisoner during a raid, before joining the rest of Alligator Company as they retake the hill from Northern hands. When the fighting ends, Eun-pyo discovers Seong-shik inexplicably drunk, leading him to discover Soo-Hyeok and other veteran soldiers enjoying the contents of a secret box buried within a cave in the hill that acts as a mail system and gift exchange between the opposing sides. Once a storage for the Southerners captured by the North, it was first used to trade insults, but evolved into exchanging pleasant letters and presents, with an occasional request for one side to send letters to their families in the other side; explaining the supposed 'mole' in the area. The veterans persuade Eun-pyo to keep quiet about their fraternization.

The winter turns to summer, but the fighting does not stop. During a patrol, Seong-shik is suddenly shot by "Two Seconds," a feared Communist sniper, so named due to the time between a victim being shot and the sound of the gunshot being heard. Although Eun-pyo attempts to save him, Soo-hyeok orders him to leave Seong-shik to die, baiting "Two Seconds" for an artillery strike that fails to kill the sniper. Eun-pyo attempts to hunt down "Two Seconds" alone, eventually subduing the sniper, only to find that 'he' is a female soldier named Cha Tae-kyeong, who is saddened by her having to kill Seong-shik, having recognized him over their battles and gift exchanges. He reluctantly lets her go. Eun-pyo confronts Soo-hyeok over his callousness, further inflamed when Soo-hyeok cruelly mocks one of the disabled children living in the camp, but their argument goes nowhere. Captain Young-il is wounded trying to calm a crazed veteran soldier demanding to see friends who died at Pohang. Upon Eun-pyo's questioning, Soo-hyeok reveals that the company had to abandon many fellow soldiers during a rout at Pohang to save themselves. With limited boats to evacuate, they even had to kill them to stay afloat; much to their shame and regret. The veteran is transferred out, doomed to a dishonorable discharge, and the orphans are evacuated as Soo-hyeok and Young-il re-install discipline and rebuild the men's will to fight.

Later, Chinese forces are deployed in human-wave attacks against the hill. During the battle, Jae-oh breaks under pressure and refuses to retreat, even as they are being overrun, over his subordinates' pleas. Soo-hyeok shoots Jae-Oh dead in front of Eun-pyo, takes command with Young-il, and leads the company to safety. Realizing who he was searching for, Eun-pyo threatens to arrest him for Jae-oh's and the previous company commander's murders. But Soo-hyeok retorts that the two dead leaders were putting them at risk and had to be replaced for the good of the company. Soo-hyeok later falls victim to "Two Seconds," devastating Eun-Pyo and the others.

After the battle, the armistice agreement is signed, and celebrations start on both sides. North and South Korean troops encounter each other at a stream, but after a tense moment, quietly wave each other goodbye. After a short briefing however, they were reminded by a high-commanding officer that the armistice will not take effect for another 12 hours. Both sides are ordered to capture and hold as much territory as possible, determining the final border between the two nations. In a savage climactic battle, everyone on both sides is killed, including Captain Young-il and Cha Tae-kyung the sniper, save for North Korean commander Jung-Yoon, albeit gravely wounded, and Eun-pyo.

The two men meet in the cave with the gift box. Eun-pyo asks Jung-yoon why exactly they are fighting. Jung-yoon replies that he knew once, but has now forgotten. They suddenly hear on the radio that the armistice has come into effect and all fighting is to cease immediately, to which they burst out laughing. They share a smoke, but Jung-Yoon succumbs to his wounds.

The film ends with a shell-shocked Eun-Pyo walking alone down the devastated, bloodsoaked hill covered by the corpses of all the fallen soldiers, leaving the ultimate fate of Aerok Hill unknown.

Cast

 Shin Ha-kyun as First Lieutenant Kang Eun-Pyo
 Go Soo as First Lieutenant Kim Soo-Hyeok
 Lee Je-hoon as Captain Shin Il-Young, the young company commander.
 Ryu Seung-soo as Oh Gi-Yeong
 Ko Chang-seok as Master-Sergeant Yang Hyo-Sam
 Kim Ok-bin as Cha Tae-Kyeong, the North Korean female sniper, known as 'Two Seconds' due to the time delay between her bullet hitting the target and the sound of the shot.
 Ryu Seung-ryong as Hyeon Jeong-Yoon, the North Korean commander.
 Lee David as Nam Seong-Shik, the recruit.
 Seo Joon-yeol as tobacco soldier.
 Choi Min as anti-aircraft army officer.
 Jo Min-ho as 2P radio soldier.
 Kim Rok-gyeong as reservist soldier.
 Han Seong-yong as squad leader.
 Ha Su-ho as Third Platoon member.
 Yoon Min-soo as Alligator Company staff sergeant.
 Cho Jin-woong as Yoo Jae-ho.
 Park Yeong-seo as Hwang Seon-cheol.
 Jung In-gi as Lee Sang-eok.
 Woo Seung-min.
 Jang In-ho.
 Ha Seong-cheol.

Awards and nominations

See also 
 List of South Korean submissions for the Academy Award for Best Foreign Language Film
 Taegukgi

References

External links 
  
  
 
 
 

2011 films
2010s action war films
South Korean war drama films
Korean War films
Films set in 1950
Films set in 1953
South Korean historical action films
Films set in Gangwon
Films directed by Jang Hoon
Best Picture Grand Bell Award winners
Showbox films
2010s Korean-language films
Films about the Republic of Korea Armed Forces
2010s historical action films
2010s South Korean films